"Je t'aime… moi non plus" (French for "I love you… me neither") is a 1967 song written by Serge Gainsbourg for Brigitte Bardot. In 1969, Gainsbourg recorded the best known version with Jane Birkin. The duet reached number one in the UK, the first foreign language song to do so, and number two in Ireland, but was banned in several countries due to its overtly sexual content.

In 1976, Gainsbourg directed Birkin in an erotic film of the same name.

History
The song was written and recorded in late 1967 for Gainsbourg's girlfriend, Brigitte Bardot. After a disappointing, witless date with Bardot, the next day, she "phoned and demanded as a penance" that he write, for her, "the most beautiful love song he could imagine" and that night he wrote "Je t'aime" and "Bonnie and Clyde". They recorded an arrangement of "Je t'aime" by Michel Colombier at a Paris studio in a two-hour session in a small glass booth; the engineer William Flageollet said there was "heavy petting". However, news of the recording reached the press and Bardot's husband, German businessman Gunter Sachs, was angry and called for the single to be withdrawn. Bardot pleaded with Gainsbourg not to release it. He complied but observed "The music is very pure. For the first time in my life, I write a love song and it's taken badly."

In 1968, Gainsbourg and English actress Jane Birkin began a relationship when they met on the set of the film Slogan. After filming, he asked her to record the song with him. Birkin had heard the Bardot version and thought it "so hot". She said: "I only sang it because I didn't want anybody else to sing it", jealous at the thought of his sharing a recording studio with someone else. Gainsbourg asked her to sing an octave higher than Bardot, "so you'll sound like a little boy". It was recorded in an arrangement by Arthur Greenslade in a studio at Marble Arch. Birkin said she "got a bit carried away with the heavy breathing – so much so, in fact, that I was told to calm down, which meant that at one point I stopped breathing altogether. If you listen to the record now, you can still hear that little gap." There was media speculation, as with the Bardot version, that they had recorded live sex, to which Gainsbourg told Birkin, "Thank goodness it wasn't, otherwise I hope it would have been a long-playing record." It was released in February 1969. The single had a plain cover, with the words "Interdit aux moins de 21 ans" (forbidden to those under 21), and the record company changed the label from Philips to its subsidiary Fontana.

Gainsbourg also asked Marianne Faithfull to record the song with him; she said: "Hah! He asked everybody". Others approached included Valérie Lagrange and Mireille Darc. Bardot regretted not releasing her version, and her friend Jean-Louis Remilleux persuaded her to contact Gainsbourg. They released it in 1986.

Lyrics and music 
The title was inspired by a Salvador Dalí comment: "Picasso is Spanish, me too. Picasso is a genius, me too. Picasso is a communist, me neither". Gainsbourg claimed it was an "anti-fuck" song about the desperation and impossibility of physical love. The lyrics are written as a dialogue between two lovers during sex. Phrases include: 
"Je vais et je viens, entre tes reins" ("I go and I come, between your loins")
"Tu es la vague, moi l'île nue" ("You are the wave, me the naked island")
"L'amour physique est sans issue" ("Physical love is hopeless" [Gainsbourg sings 'sensationnel' in another version)

"Je t'aime, moi non plus" is translated as "I love you – me not anymore" in the Pet Shop Boys' version. The lyrics are sung, spoken and whispered over a baroque organ and guitar track in C major, with a "languid, almost over pretty, chocolate box melody".

Reception

The eroticism was declared offensive. The lyrics are commonly thought to refer to the taboo of sex without love, and were delivered in a breathy, suggestive style. The Observer Monthly Music magazine later called it "the pop equivalent of an Emmanuelle movie".
When the version with Bardot was recorded, the French press reported that it was an "audio vérité". France Dimanche said the "groans, sighs, and Bardot's little cries of pleasure [give] the impression you're listening to two people making love". The first time Gainsbourg played it in public was in a Paris restaurant immediately after they recorded it. Birkin said that "as it began to play all you could hear were the knives and forks being put down. 'I think we have a hit record', he said."

The song culminates in orgasm sounds by Birkin: mostly because of this, it was banned from radio in Spain, Sweden, Brazil, the UK, Italy, and Portugal, banned before 11 pm in France, not played by many radio stations in the United States because it was deemed too risqué, and denounced by the Vatican and the L'Osservatore Romano; one report even claimed the Vatican excommunicated the record executive who released it in Italy. Birkin says Gainsbourg called the Pope "our greatest PR man".

Birkin said in 2004 that, "It wasn't a rude song at all. I don't know what all the fuss was about. The English just didn't understand it. I'm still not sure they know what it means." When Gainsbourg went to Jamaica to record with Sly and Robbie, they initially did not get on well. They said "We know just one piece of French music, a song called 'Je t'aime… Moi Non Plus', which has a girl groaning in it." Gainsbourg said "It's me", and their mood changed immediately.

Commercial success 
The song was a commercial success throughout Europe selling 3 million by October 1969. By 1986, it had sold four million copies. In the UK, it was released on the Fontana label, but, after reaching number two, it was withdrawn from sale. Gainsbourg arranged a deal with Major Minor Records and on re-release it reached number one, the first banned number one single in the UK and the first single in a foreign language to top the charts. It stayed on the UK chart for 31 weeks. It even made the Top 100 in the United States, reaching number 58 on the Billboard Hot 100 chart . Mercury Records, the US distributor, faced criticism that the song was "obscene" and there was limited airplay, limiting US sales to around 150,000. It was re-released in the UK in late 1974 on the Atlantic Records subsidiary Antic Records and charted again peaking at No. 31 and charting for nine weeks. By August 1969, the single sold 300,000 copies in Italy  while in France in 1969 alone sold 400,000 copies. In UK sales were over 250,000. By 1996, it sold 6 million copies worldwide.

Covers 

The song has been covered dozens of times, both serious and comedic. In 1969, the Hollywood 101 Strings Orchestra released a 7-inch record single (on A/S Records label) with two versions: the A-side featured a fully instrumental recording while the B-side had sexually suggestive vocalizations done by Bebe Bardon. The first covers were instrumentals, "Love at first sight", after the original was banned; the first version by a British group named Sounds Nice (featuring Tim Mycroft on keyboard) became a top 20 hit. (The group's name "sounds nice" actually represents the two words Paul McCartney said when he heard this instrumental cover of the song). The first parody was written in 1970 by Gainsbourg himself and Marcel Mithois. Titled "Ça", it was recorded by Bourvil and Jacqueline Maillan, Bourvil's last release before his death. Other comedy versions were made by Frankie Howerd and June Whitfield, Judge Dread, and Gorden Kaye and Vicki Michelle, stars of the BBC TV comedy 'Allo 'Allo!, in character.

Je t'aime has been sampled in many other songs, including: "A Fair Affair (Je T'Aime)" by Misty Oldland; "Guitar Song" by Texas, and a version of "Breathe" in Kylie Minogue's 2003 Money Can't Buy concert at the Hammersmith Apollo in London.

The song's title was used, partly in French and partly in Russian, as the title of Russian singer Eva Polna's Je T'aime (Я тебя тоже нет), "Я тебя тоже нет" (ya tebya tozhe nyet) meaning "I (don’t love) you either".

Zvonimir Levačić 'Ševa' and Ivica Lako 'Laky', members of the Croatian antitelevision late night talk show Nightmare Stage, performed a live version of the song as part of a spoof singing competition during the show's airing. This version was later named the weirdest cover of the song ever.

Legacy 
The song influenced the 1975 disco classic "Love to Love You Baby" by singer Donna Summer and producer Giorgio Moroder. In a note to Neil Bogart, producer A. J. Cervantes (son of politician Alfonso J. Cervantes), who previously worked for Casablanca Records, suggested an idea of Donna Summer recording the song. Bogart initially rejected the idea. Cervantes' record label Butterfly Records released the disco rendition as "Je t'aime" by an all-female disco group Saint Tropez in August 1977, the first disco rendition of the song, as part of the album of the same name, Je T'aime (1977). Prompted by the minor success of Saint Tropez, a year later in 1978, Casablanca Records released the Summer and Moroder duet rendition of "Je t'aime" in a 15-minute version for the film Thank God It's Friday. The Summer–Moroder rendition was produced by Moroder and Pete Bellotte.

See also 
List of songs banned by the BBC

References

French-language songs
1968 songs
1969 singles
1969 in France
1978 singles
Serge Gainsbourg songs
Brigitte Bardot songs
UK Singles Chart number-one singles
Number-one singles in Norway
Number-one singles in Switzerland
Donna Summer songs
Miss Kittin songs
Songs written by Serge Gainsbourg
Male–female vocal duets
Cat Power songs
Judge Dread songs
Fontana Records singles
Casablanca Records singles
Obscenity controversies in music
Songs banned by the BBC
1967 neologisms
Quotations from music